Twomile Creek is a stream in Oregon County in the Ozarks of southern Missouri. It is a tributary of the Warm Fork Spring River.

The stream source area lies about 1.5 miles southeast of Koshkonong and the stream flows southeast roughly paralleling U.S. Route 63 until entering the Warm Fork Spring River in east Thayer.

Twomile Creek was named due to the presumed length.

See also
List of rivers of Missouri

References

Rivers of Oregon County, Missouri
Rivers of Missouri